George Kwabena Adu (born 17 October 1981) is a Ghanaian musician, guitarist, and an accomplished draftsman. His name, Kwabena Kwabena depicts the two vocations he is presently in, first as Kwabena, the draftsman, and Kwabena, the contemporary highlife musician.
He emerged after featuring on Kontihene's 2004 hit, Esi and he featured Kontihene on his own debut hit, Aso.

Early life
Kwabena attended Datus Complex in Bubuashie, Green Hill School in Achimota, and Aggrey Junior Secondary School. He is an old student of St. Peters Secondary School in Nkwatia and is a proud PERSCOBA. He started playing the guitar in church at the age of 14 and he also led the church choir.
He then started hanging around Hush Hush studios featuring on various songs. He got introduced to Hammer of the Last 2.

Career
His break through came in 2004 when he recorded is debut album ASO. Three of the songs were used in the soundtrack of Sparrow Productions's The Perfect Picture. Some of his hits include Ka kyere me, Trodom, Adea waye me, Fakye me, and Me ne woa. In 2007, he released his second album, Dabi. Kwabena Kwabena has a strong passion for philanthropic work and believes in his Ghanaian environment. This passion spurred him on to set up the KwabenaKwabena Save A Life Foundation. Kwabena went on to achieve a number of local and international awards some of which include, the best vocal performance and the best songwriter.

His third album, Daakye, came out in 2013 which also had hit songs like Bue Kwan, Adult Music, Bye Bye, etc.

References

External links
 (official)

Living people
Place of birth missing (living people)
1978 births
Ghanaian musicians
St. Peter's Boys Senior High School alumni